Rajan Sippy is a Emirati businessman and former actor who acted in several films in the 1980s and also produced the film Shehzaade (1989). He is currently a businessman in Dubai and runs the restaurant "The Moghul Room".

Rajan Sippy began his acting career in the Ramsay Horror 3D film 3D Saamri (1985) and also played a horror role in their next chiller Dak Bangla (1987). He also played Madhuri Dixit's hero in the film Awara Baap (1985). He turned to production and produced a movie called Shehzaade (1989), starring Shatrughan Sinha, Dharmendra and Dimple Kapadia. In the 1990s, Rajan Sippy shifted to Dubai.

Today, he is one of the most successful Indian entrepreneurs there, with a chain of hotels and night clubs. He has even employed former Bollywood actresses like Kalpana Iyer and Sonika Gill as managers in his popular restaurant "The Moghul Room".

Partial filmography

 Saamri – 1985
 Awara Baap – 1985
 Dak Bangla – 1987
 Woh Din Aayega=1987
 Patton Ki Bazi – 1986
 Shoorveer- 1988
 Aakhri Muqabla – 1988
 Shehzaade – 1989
 Amba - 1990
 Zakhmo Ka Hisaab - 1993

References

External links

Male actors in Hindi cinema
Living people
20th-century Indian male actors
Year of birth missing (living people)